The Honored Matres are a fictional matriarchal organization in Frank Herbert's science fiction Dune universe. They are described as an aggressive cult obsessed with power, violence, and sexual domination. For this reason they are often described as "whores", especially by their enemies, the Bene Gesserit.

The Honored Matres are first introduced in Herbert's Heretics of Dune (1984) and play a continued role in his final Dune novel, Chapterhouse: Dune (1985). They also appear in Hunters of Dune (2006) and Sandworms of Dune (2007), novels by Herbert's son Brian Herbert and author Kevin J. Anderson that conclude the original series. The sequels are based on Frank Herbert's notes for his planned seventh novel in the series.

Storylines
After the death of the tyrant Leto II Atreides in God Emperor of Dune (1981), trillions of people of the Old Empire take to the stars in a diaspora known as the Scattering. Representatives from each major race and order of the Empire spread out beyond the known universe in fleets of no-ships, beginning the journey along Leto II's Golden Path to save mankind from destruction.

Introduction 
The Honored Matres develop during this Scattering; in Heretics of Dune, they return to the Old Empire, wreaking havoc and leaving destruction in their wake. Tleilaxu Master Waff notes that they are "Far more terrible than Reverend Mothers of the Bene Gesserit." It is ultimately indicated in Chapterhouse Dune that they are fleeing a powerful "unknown enemy" who had conquered their own massive empire out in the Scattering.

Violent and without mercy, the Matres possess military and sexual skills that seem to indicate to some that they are an outgrowth from or a combination of the Fish Speakers and Bene Gesserit who fled out into the Scattering. They do not, however, possess Other Memory or use melange, though their skill as sexual imprinters has surpassed that of the Bene Gesserit. The Matres target the Bene Tleilax, and capture and torture as many Bene Gesserit Reverend Mothers as possible to glean their secrets. Similarly, the Bene Gesserit hope to decipher their new enemies' motives, and learn enough about the fearsome Matres to defeat them.

The Honored Matres make many attacks on Bene Gesserit strongholds throughout the known bounds of the Old Empire. They mark the Bene Gesserit Bashar Miles Teg and the Duncan Idaho ghola for death, destroying the Gammu Keep in an unsuccessful attempt to kill Idaho, and annihilating the planet Rakis with their Obliterators, killing Teg.

Eventually, the core of the Honored Matres is destroyed according to the plan of the Bene Gesserit leader, Mother Superior Darwi Odrade. At the Battle of Junction, the Honored Matre stronghold, both Odrade and Great Honored Matre Logno perish, giving Murbella, a former Honored Matre assimilated into the Bene Gesserit, the chance to ascend to both positions, carrying out the rest of Odrade's plan by unifying the orders.

Hunters of Dune 
The first sequel to the original Dune series finds the Bene Gesserit unified with the Honored Matres into a New Sisterhood. Joining forces to prepare for their mutual Enemy, both factions struggle to coexist in this new form, under Murbella's rule.

But renegade Matres still persist; led by Matre Superior Hellica, they still maintain strongholds on captured worlds such as Buzzell, Gammu, and Tleilax. Over the course of twenty years, Murbella leads the Sisterhood against the renegades, culminating in the Battle of Tleilax, where Hellica is killed and the planet is completely destroyed. Upon killing Hellica, Murbella discovers that she is in fact a Face Dancer. With the fall of Tleilax, and the revelation of Face Dancer infiltration, the unbalanced and vindictive breed of Honored Matres is crushed.

Origins
Murbella soon learns the "missing link" in the origin of the Matres by exploring their past through Other Memory; initially a hybrid group of Bene Gesserit and Fish Speakers, they had developed their violent tendencies with their third addition: awakened Tleilaxu females. The best kept secret of the Tleilaxu—that their famed axlotl tanks are in fact their race's females kept in a vegetative state—had been laid bare before the matriarchal alliance, and their wrath had known no bounds. Attacking every Tleilaxu planet on their way out of the galaxy, the martial prowess of both the Fish Speakers and the Bene Gesserit had ensured their victory. They had managed to liberate a number of the axlotl tanks, and their next task had been to rehabilitate the brain-dead women. The fledgling order had enjoyed a modicum of success, and eventually the Tleilaxu females, angry at their males for treating them in such a way, had vowed revenge. Thus, when the Honored Matres burst upon the universe again, they take special care to lay waste to every extant Tleilaxu world (though the Matres of later generations cannot remember the origin of their own hatred for the Tleilaxu). This anger leads to the name of the order, "Honored Matres", or Honored Mothers.

The Enemy
Murbella also discovers the true nature of the unknown Enemy: they are the resurrected thinking machines, thought destroyed 15,000 years before, at the end of the Butlerian Jihad, but amassing a force to finally exterminate humanity. Through Other Memory she witnesses the Honored Matres' first encounter with the unknown Enemy. A young Matre commander had invaded an area controlled by the remnants of the machine empire, with initial success. However, the thinking machines' retribution had been terrible, especially when they had realized that humans still existed. The machines had destroyed the Honored Matre empire, and the remnants had then fled back to the Old Empire to build a new dominion.

Characteristics 

The Honored Matres rule through sexual enslavement, sheer physical power, and the terror inspired by their draconian methods. They are completely without mercy and quick to anger, often resorting to extreme measures of violence in the face of the slightest provocations. The Bene Gesserit initially believe that these tendencies arise from the rage that comes from their inability to satisfy the increasingly jaded tastes that necessarily come from being able to exercise absolute sexual or sensual control over another person. However, Murbella, the combined Mother Commander of both the Honored Matres and Bene Gesserit, is able to access the Other Memories of the Honored Matres to find that these tendencies come from the Tleilaxu females' retribution towards males from the millennia of abuse they suffered as axlotl tanks. The leadership succession practices employed by the order are severe; a subordinate sister who manages to kill the leader, the so-called Great Honored Matre or Matre Superior, takes her place.

The Honored Matres lack the control that the Bene Gesserit have over their internal chemistry, making them vulnerable to disease in ways the Bene Gesserit are not. Lacking Bene Gesserit Other Memory, the Honored Matres use an agony-inducing device known as a T-Probe in order to impress knowledge directly to their nervous system.

Sexual imprinting

The Honored Matres are characterized by their extremely violent tendencies and their ability to imprint a man sexually, amplifying his orgasmic response to such an ecstatic height that the victim of an imprinting becomes "addicted" to his imprinter, thereby becoming a willing slave of the Honored Matre who "marks" him. Both of these qualities are presumably evolutions of the unbridled sexual energies of the Siaynoq communion once enjoyed by the Fish Speakers with the God Emperor Leto II Atreides. The sexual imprinting practiced by the Honored Matres also hints at their roots in the original Bene Gesserit, who possessed similar, though significantly less potent, abilities.

Alternative to melange

As the Bene Gesserit rely on melange and its many beneficial properties, the Honored Matres employ (and are similarly addicted to) a different drug that stimulates the production of adrenaline and other chemicals typically produced by the body when experiencing pain. In addition to heightening the senses and responses of a user, this stimulant causes the eyes of an addict to be covered in flecks of orange when agitated, and when an addict is completely enraged the eyes are consumed by the color orange.

Prana-bindu and the Hormu fighting style

The Honored Matres exercise a form of what the Bene Gesserit refer to as prana-bindu, but they execute movement at a speed that far outmatches that of their Bene Gesserit contemporaries. This is coupled with their fighting style, known as "Hormu", which is centered on the use of kicks to weak points on the body. The combination of these produces a warrior that is superhumanly fast and more than a match for any fully trained Reverend Mother in direct combat.

Linguistic skills

Honored Matres are capable of using combinations of language and tone in order to compel listeners into obedience on a subconscious level. Through manipulating the use of these skills, an Honored Matre is capable of prompting the unconscious mind on a level that may be difficult to resist. However, in Chapterhouse: Dune both Odrade and Murbella comment that these skills are nowhere near as potent as the Bene Gesserit Voice. Further, in Heretics of Dune, Odrade theorizes that the Honored Matres may have been driven back from the Scattering as their subjects have developed resistance to their form of Voice control due to its over use.

Notable Honored Matres

Dama  
In Chapterhouse Dune, the Great Honored Matre on Junction is Dama; she is referred to as "Spider Queen" by the Bene Gesserit leader Darwi Odrade. Bene Gesserit Reverend Mother Lucilla flees the destruction of Lampadas by the Honored Matres, but is forced to land on Gammu. She is captured and brought before Dama, but not killed outright.

A game of words begins, and Dama tries to persuade Lucilla to join the Honored Matres, preserving her life in exchange for Bene Gesserit secrets. Dama does not try to hide the fact that the Matres dearly want to learn to modify their biochemistry as the Bene Gesserit do. These word battles with Lucilla continue for weeks. When she reveals to Dama that, although the Bene Gesserit know how to manipulate and control the populace, they practice and believe in democracy, Dama's desire to destroy the Sisterhood is redoubled when she discovers the Bene Gesserit teach this dangerous knowledge. Dama kills Lucilla.

Dama soon meets with Mother Superior Odrade; Dama at first seems surprisingly cooperative, but Odrade soon realizes that Dama intends no reasonable negotiation. Under cover of Odrade's diplomacy, the Bene Gesserit forces under Miles Teg attack Junction with tremendous force. Logno—chief advisor to Dama—assassinates Dama with poison and assumes control of the Honored Matres.

Hellica  
In Hunters of Dune, Hellica has declared herself Matre Superior of the largest renegade Honored Matre force. Based on the conquered planet Tleilax in the formal capital Bandalong, Hellica forces captive Lost Tleilaxu Uxtal to produce increased quantities of the orange spice substitute using the secret of the Tleilaxu axlotl tanks. Uxtal is also producing gholas for the Face Dancer Khrone; Hellica befriends the sociopathic ghola of Baron Vladimir Harkonnen. When Guild Navigator Edrik seeks Uxtal's knowledge in producing melange in the tanks, Hellica's price for his expertise is Edrik's help transporting a certain cargo. He agrees, delivering by heighliner the Obliterators that destroy the planet Richese, where the Bene Gesserit are mass-producing weapons and armed battleships. Later, Hellica attempts an Obliterator attack on Chapterhouse itself, but the plan fails. Murbella's forces conquer Tleilax, and Hellica is killed. However, it is revealed that she and some of her elite guard were actually Face Dancer duplicates; it is unknown when the original Hellica was disposed of and replaced.

Logno  
In Chapterhouse Dune, Logno assassinates Great Honored Matre Dama with poison while the Bene Gesserit forces are attacking Junction. Logno, the former chief advisor to Dama, assumes control of the Honored Matres and immediately surrenders. Bene Gesserit leader Odrade is surprised, but she and Miles Teg soon realize they have fallen into a trap. The Honored Matres use "the Weapon" and turn defeat into victory. Murbella saves as much of the Bene Gesserit force as she can and they begin to withdraw to Chapterhouse. Odrade, however, had planned for the possible failure of the Bene Gesserit attack and left Murbella instructions for a last desperate gamble. Murbella pilots a small craft down to the surface, announcing herself as an Honored Matre who, in the confusion, has managed to escape the Bene Gesserit with all their secrets. She arrives on the planet and immediately announces her intentions by killing an overeager Honored Matre with a blinding speed enhanced by Bene Gesserit training that makes her faster than any Honored Matre before her. Murbella is taken to Logno, and immediately declares herself hostile. Logno cannot help herself and attacks, Murbella disposes of her and some allies. She takes charge of the Honored Matres, who are awed by her physical prowess.

Murbella 

In Heretics of Dune, Chapterhouse: Dune, Hunters of Dune and Sandworms of Dune Murbella is Honored Matre with above average abilities when compared to other Matres. She eventually becomes the leader of the Honored Matres and the Bene Gesserit, calling it the New Sisterhood.

Analysis, significance and reception 
The Matres appear only in the final two novel of the main series. They have been described as one of two "powerful, all-female organizations" in the universe (the other being the Fish Wives or Fish Speakers). Kara Kennedy sees them, in the context of the discussion of women's sexual agency in the novels, as "a foil to the Bene Gesserits' attitude towards sexuality".

References

Dune (franchise) organizations
Fictional religions
Fictional matriarchies